Dimitrios Liapidis (Kalabaka, Trikala, 1871 – ?) was a Greek politician.

Biography 
He was from Kalabaka and studied medicine. He entered the army reaching the rank of general chief physician. He also acted as president of the community of Kalabaka.

He was elected member of parliament for Trikala, with the support of the Farmers' Party in the 1932 Greek legislative election and reelected as member of parliament for Kalabaka in 1933 and 1935.

References 

1871 births
People from Kalabaka
Greek MPs 1932–1933
Greek MPs 1933–1935
Greek MPs 1935–1936
Year of death missing